The 2003–04 season was the 126th season in Bolton Wanderers F.C.'s existence, and was their third consecutive year in the top-flight. This article covers the period from 1 July 2003 to 30 June 2004.

First-team squad

Left club during season

Reserve squad

Transfers

In
  Stelios Giannakopoulos -  Olympiacos, 28 May 2003
  Iván Campo -  Real Madrid, free transfer, 18 July 2003
  Kevin Davies -  Southampton, free transfer, 23 July 2003
  Ricardo Vaz Tê -  S.C. Farense, free transfer, 27 August 2003
  Mário Jardel -  Sporting CP, £1,158,000, 13 August 2003
  Emerson Thome - Sunderland, free transfer, 29 August 2003
  Ibrahim Ba -  Milan, free transfer, 11 September 2003
  Glen Little -  Burnley, month loan, 1 September 2003
  Donovan Ricketts -  Village United, five-month loan, 2 January 2004
  Javi Moreno -  Atlético Madrid, five-month loan, 5 January 2004
  Steve Howey -  Leicester City, undisclosed, 29 January 2004
  Dwight Pezzarossi -  Comunicaciones, four-month loan, 30 January 2004
  Jon Otsemobor -  Liverpool, four-month loan, 2 February 2004
  Cleveland Taylor -  Scunthorpe United

Out
  Colin Hendry - retired
  Guðni Bergsson - retired
  Leam Richardson - released (later joined  Blackpool on 23 June 2003)
  Mike Whitlow - released (later joined  Sheffield United in 2003)
  Paul Warhurst - released (later joined  Chesterfield in October 2003)
  Jonathan Walters -  Hull City, 2004
  Bülent Akın -  Akçaabat Sebatspor
  Gareth Farrelly -  Wigan Athletic
  Delroy Facey -  West Bromwich Albion
  Chris Armstrong -  Wrexham
  Gerald Forschelet -  Neuchâtel Xamax
  Cleveland Taylor -  Scunthorpe United
  Jon Otsemobor -  Liverpool, loan end

Results

FA Premier League

FA Cup

Carling Cup

Statistics

Appearances
Bolton used a total of 29 players during the season.

Top scorers

References

 

2003-04
2003–04 FA Premier League by team